Citadelle, the French word for citadel, may refer to:

Citadel of Quebec or La Citadelle, a military installation and government residence in Quebec City, Canada
Citadelle Laferrière or the Citadelle, a 19th-century fortress in Nord, Haiti
Citadelle (gin), a French brand of gin
Citadelle, a 1948 book by Antoine de Saint-Exupéry
Citadelle, a 2019 album by Izïa

See also

Citadel (disambiguation)
Cittadella (disambiguation)
Citadellet, a demolished 19th-century Norwegian fortress
The Citadel (disambiguation)